The Song You Gave Me is a 1933 British musical film directed by Paul L. Stein, and starring Bebe Daniels, Victor Varconi, and Frederick Lloyd. It was made at Elstree Studios. The film's sets were designed by the art director John Mead. It was distributed in America by Columbia Pictures. It was based on a play by Walter Reisch which had previously been adapted into the 1930 German film The Song Is Ended.

Cast
Bebe Daniels as Mitzi Hansen
Victor Varconi as Karl Linden
Frederick Lloyd as Baron Bobo
Claude Hulbert as Tony Brandt
Lester Matthews as Max Winter
Iris Ashley as Emmy
Eva Moore as grandmother
Stewart Granger as waiter
Victor Rietti as nightclub manager
Walter Widdop as singer

See also
The Song Is Ended (1930)

References

Bibliography
Low, Rachael. Filmmaking in 1930s Britain. George Allen & Unwin, 1985.

External links

British musical films
1933 musical films
Films directed by Paul L. Stein
Films shot at British International Pictures Studios
Films set in Vienna
Operetta films
British remakes of German films
British black-and-white films
1930s British films
1930s English-language films